The Ibis Styles Araneta City (stylized as ibis Styles Araneta City) is a 286-room hotel located in the Araneta City, Quezon City, Philippines. The upcoming economy hotel is part of AccorHotels, and set to be the first hotel under the Ibis Styles brand in the Philippines.

History
The plans for the Ibis Styles hotel were laid out as early as 2014, as part of the Gateway Mall 2 complex, an expansion development of Gateway Mall, set to rise on the former Gateway Food Park. Following the successful opening of the Novotel Manila Araneta City on March 2016, Araneta Center Inc. (ACI, Inc.) announced in March 2018, that a second hotel would be built at the Araneta Center (now Araneta City). The second hotel was touted to be "a lifestyle budget hotel" run by "a popular international brand". Groundbreaking started in August 2017, while the ceremonial groundbreaking for the Gateway Mall 2 including the adjacent Ibis Styles hotel took place in the same month on the following year, on August 2018. The Ibis Styles hotel, like Novotel Manila Araneta City is also a hotel brand under AccorHotels under the Ibis Styles brand
, and costed  to build, with Megawide Construction Corporation serving as the general contractor. The Araneta Group also appointed AMCOM & Company Inc. serving as the general consultant for the projects, along with the New Gateway Mall.

On January 20, 2020, the hotel was officially topped off, and is scheduled to begin partial operations in late 2020 with full operations projected by early 2021. The target date for the completion and opening of the New Gateway Mall complex is expected within the 4th quarter of 2022, while the hotel is set to be completed and opened within early 2023.

Development and Location
The hotel is part of the Gateway Square complex, a  prime mixed-use, transit-oriented superblock within the Araneta City. The superblock features retail shops, offices, restaurants, leisure amenities, lodging spaces, and entertainment facilities, while having over 3,000 parking spaces upon completion, and is directly connected to other buildings via sky bridges and walk paths. The complex consists of the two Gateway Malls, the Gateway Tower, the Gateway Office Building, the Novotel Manila Araneta City, the Smart Araneta Coliseum, and the Araneta Coliseum Parking Garage.

The hotel is located adjacent to the Gateway Mall and the upcoming Gateway Mall 2 along General Roxas Avenue, and stands at the north-western corner of the Araneta Coliseum. The hotel is also accessible near malls such SM Cubao, the Farmers Plaza, and Ali Mall, the New Frontier Theater through the Gateway Link Bridge, the Manhattan Gardens condominiums, the Araneta City Cyberpark towers; railway stations such as the MRT 3 Cubao Station on the west, the LRT 2 Cubao Station on the north, and other transport terminals, such as the Araneta City Bus Terminal and the Araneta City Busport, the Farmers Plaza UV Express terminal, and the Araneta Jeepney Terminal.

Architecture
The hotel was designed by RTKL Associates in collaboration with Sudhakar Thakurdesai, along with the help of local architectural firms Palafox Associates and Aidea. The architecture of the building is similarly designed to the Cyberpark Tower 1, located at the Araneta City Cyberpark, which features a asymmetrical facade with touches of brown hue varieties within the white colored exteriors, while the hotel's rooms and interior designs will be based from the historical events in the Araneta Coliseum throughout its 60-year (1960-2020) history.

Features
Ibis Styles also houses a total of six different function rooms for various meetings and conferences.

The hotel will also feature a lobby lounge, an all day dining restaurant and patisserie, and a roof deck swimming pool with a roof deck pool bar, providing guests with a special view of the Manila Bay sunset.

References

Hotels in Metro Manila
Buildings and structures in Quezon City
Accor hotels